Saguny is a rural locality (a settlement) and the administrative center of Beryozovskoye Rural Settlement, Podgorensky District, Voronezh Oblast, Russia. The population was 246 as of 2010.

Geography 
Saguny is located 35 km north of Podgorensky (the district's administrative centre) by road. Beryozovo is the nearest rural locality.

References 

Rural localities in Podgorensky District